Hobbseus orconectoides, the Oktibbeha riverlet crayfish, is a species of crayfish in the family Cambaridae. It is endemic to Mississippi in the United States.

The IUCN conservation status of Hobbseus orconectoides is "EN", endangered. The species faces a high risk of extinction in the near future. The IUCN status was reviewed in 2010.

References

Further reading

 
 

Cambaridae
Articles created by Qbugbot
Crustaceans described in 1968
Taxa named by Joseph F. Fitzpatrick Jr.
Endemic fauna of Mississippi